How Spriggins Took Lodgers is a 1911 silent film short produced by the Edison Manufacturing Company. It starred J. Sedley Brown, Marc McDermott and Miriam Nesbitt. Released through the General Film Company.

Cast
J. Sedley Brown - Spriggins
Marc McDermott - The Major
Miriam Nesbitt - The Major's Wife
Carrie Clark Ward - Anna Maria, the kitchen maid(*as Mrs. Sedley Brown)
Edward Boulden - The Frenchman

References

External links
 How Spriggins Took Lodgers at IMDb.com

1911 films
American silent short films
1911 short films
Edison Manufacturing Company films
American black-and-white films
1910s American films